The Octagon may refer to:

The Octagon, Christchurch, a former church in the central city of Christchurch, New Zealand
The Octagon, Dunedin, the city centre of Dunedin, New Zealand
The Octagon (Egypt), the headquarters of the Egyptian Ministry of Defense in the New Administrative Capital of Egypt
The Octagon House, Washington, D.C.
The Octagon (Heidelberg University), Tiffin, Ohio
The Octagon (Roosevelt Island), New York
The Octagon at Amherst College, Massachusetts
The Octagon (film), a 1980 Chuck Norris movie
The Octagon (album), a 2020 album by Australian rapper Chillinit
The Octagon, the trademarked name for the enclosure in Ultimate Fighting Championship#Octagon mixed-martial-arts bouts

See also
Octagon (disambiguation)
Octagon Building (disambiguation)
Octagon Theatre, Bolton, Greater Manchester, England
Octagon Theatre, Perth, a theatre at the University of Western Australia